Alarm Agents is an album by "Death in June & Boyd Rice".

CD version

Credits
Guitar, Keyboards, Backing Vocals – Douglas Pearce
Lead Vocals – Boyd Rice
Percussion – Jonh Murphy
Recorded By – Dave Lokan (tracks: 11), Mark Hamill (tracks: 4, 14, 16), Robert Ferbrache (tracks: 1 to 3, 5 to 10, 12, 13, 15, 17, 18)

Studios
Recorded between Halloween, October 2002 and Mid-Winter's Night, December 2003. All tracks conceived and recorded at Absinthe Studios, Denver, U.S.A., except for 4, 14 and 16, which were recorded at New Centurion Studios, Wellington, New Zealand, and 11 which was recorded at Big Sound Studios, Adelaide, Australia.

Packaged in an embossed digipak.

LP version

Pressing & version
Limited to 1600 copies. 800 come in clear green vinyl. Only the LP contains the complete versions of the songs and complete different mix from the CD. Vinyl etching on side A: "The storm is no longer..." and on side B: "...out at sea !".

Credits
Guitar, Keyboards, Backing Vocals – Douglas Pearce
Lead Vocals – Boyd Rice
Percussion – Jonh Murphy
Recorded By – Dave Lokan (tracks: B2), Mark Hamill (tracks: A3, B5), Robert Ferbrache (tracks: A1, A2, A4 to B1, B3, B4, B6, B7)

Studios
Recorded between Halloween, October 2002 and Mid-Winter's Night, December 2003. All tracks conceived and recorded at Absinthe Studios, Denver, U.S.A., except for A3 and B5, which were recorded at New Centurion Studios, Wellington, New Zealand, and B2 which was recorded at Big Sound Studios, Adelaide, Australia.

Track listing

CD
"Untouchable" – 1:01
"Black Sun Rising" – 3:41
"You Love the Sun" – 1:25
"Tears of the Hunted" – 4:00
"You Love the Sun, Don't You?" – 2:38
"Storm on the Sea (Out Beyond Land)" – 5:27
"You Love the Sun and the Moon" – 0:22
"Summer is Gone" – 3:41
"Deeper Than Love" – 4:16
"An Ancient Tale is Told" – 1:44
"Are You Out There? (Dornier 17 Mix)" – 6:23
"Sunwheels of Your Mind" – 0:55
"Get Used to Saying No!" – 6:51
"Symbols in Souls" – 3:38
"An Ancient Tale is Told Again" – 1:29
"The Man Who Laughs" – 4:39
"We're All a Little Afraid" – 0:23
"Boyd's Gift" – 0:29

12"
Side A:
"Untouchable"
"Black Sun Rising"
"Tears of the Hunted"
"You Love the Sun, Don't You?"
"Storm on the Sea (Out Beyond Land)"
"Summer is Gone"
Side B:
"Deeper Than Love"
"Are You Out There?"
"Sunwheels of Your Mind"
"Get Used to Saying No!"
"Symbols in Souls"
"An Ancient Tale is Told"
"Boyd's Gift"

References

CD at discogs.com
LP at discogs.com

Death in June albums
Boyd Rice albums
2004 albums